is a town located in Katsuta District, Okayama Prefecture, Japan. , the town had an estimated population of 10,900 in 4713 households and a population density of 83 persons per km². Shōō is said to be the place where Kintarō died.

Geography
Shōō is located in the northeastern part of Okayama Prefecture. Located on the southern side of the Chugoku Mountains, it is mostly hills and forests.

Neighboring  municipalities 
Okayama Prefecture
Tsuyama
Mimasaka
Nagi
Misaki

Climate
Shōō has a Humid subtropical climate (Köppen Cfa) characterized by warm summers and cool winters with moderate snowfall.  The average annual temperature in Shōō is 14.0 °C. The average annual rainfall is 1501 mm with September as the wettest month. The temperatures are highest on average in January, at around 25.9 °C, and lowest in January, at around 2.4 °C.

Demography
Per Japanese census data, the population of Shōō has been as follows.

History 
Shōō is part of ancient Mimasaka Province. Katsurada flourished in the Edo Period as a shukuba on the main pilgrimage route to Izumo Shrine. After the Meiji restoration,  it was established as a village with the creation of the modern municipalities system on June 1, 1889, and raised to town status on March 28, 1906. On March 31, 1952, Katsuamada merged with the villages of Koyoshino and Takatori to form the town of Shōō.

Government
Shōō has a mayor-council form of government with a directly elected mayor and a unicameral town council of twelve members. Shōō, collectively with the city of Tsuyama and the towns of Kagami and Nagi, contributes four members to the Okayama Prefectural Assembly. In terms of national politics, the village is part of the Okayama 3rd district of the lower house of the Diet of Japan.

Economy
The main industry in the area is agriculture.The main crops include  black soybeans, pears, peaches, chestnuts, and grapes. The Katsutoshi Core Industrial Park is located in the Katsumada area of Shōō and has a number of pharmaceutical and chemcial plants.

Education
Shōō has two public elementary schools and one public junior high school operated by the town government, and one public high school operated by the Okayama Prefectural Board of Education.

Transportation

Railway 
 JR West (JR West) - Kishin Line
  -

Highways 
  Chūgoku Expressway

References

External links

Shōō official website 

Towns in Okayama Prefecture
Shōō, Okayama